KA Commuter line Jakarta Kota–Tanjung Priok, or the Tanjung Priok line, is a commuter rail line in Indonesia, operated by PT Kereta Commuter Indonesia. The line connects Jakarta Kota station in West Jakarta and Tanjung Priuk station in North Jakarta. On maps and diagrams, the line is shown using the colour "pink". Covering a distance of only 8.115 kilometres, the pink line is the shortest line in the Jakarta KA Commuter system, and serves mostly as the connecting feeder line between Jakarta Kota station (red and blue line) and  Kampung Bandan station (yellow line). The Pink Line traces its origins back to a railway line built from 1883–1885 during the Dutch colonial era, to connect the city of Jakarta to Tanjung Priok Port. It was also one of the earliest railway lines in Indonesia to be electrified starting from 1925. 

Initially, Ancol was not opened at the time the line was fully operational. This station was finally used as a stop from 25 June 2016.

Stations 
The distance table of Commuterline stations.

References

External links 
 KRL Jabotabek website 
 Jabotabek Railnews 
 KRL Jabodetabek 
 KRL-Mania – KRL Jabotabek community site 

Jakarta
Infrastructure in Indonesia
Transport in Jakarta